Ang Babaeng Hinugot sa Aking Tadyang (International title: Dangerous Love / ) is a 2009 Philippine television drama thriller series broadcast by GMA Network. The series is an adaptation of Carlo J. Caparas' graphic novel. Directed by Joyce E. Bernal and Topel Lee, it stars Dingdong Dantes and Marian Rivera. It premiered on February 2, 2009 on the network's Telebabad line up. The series concluded on May 1, 2009 with a total of 63 episodes.

The series was released on DVD by GMA Records.

Cast and characters

Lead cast
 Dingdong Dantes as Homer Alcaraz
 Marian Rivera as Proserfina J. Valdez-Alcaraz

Supporting cast
 Angelu de Leon as Heleen Barrientos
 Paolo Contis as Conrado "Rado" Barrientos
 Eugene Domingo as Madeline "Madel" Morales
 Carmi Martin as Hera Alcaraz
 Francine Prieto as Sheila Velasco
 Sherilyn Reyes as Galatea Alcaraz
 Lovi Poe as Athena Cruz
 Mart Escudero as Ulysses Valdez
 Jackie Rice as Cassandra Alcaraz
 Prince Stefan as Aristotle "Aris" Alcaraz
 Alyssa Alano as Citas Villareal
 Carlene Aguilar as Clarisse Morales
 Paolo Paraiso as Mike Villareal
 Celia Rodriguez as Laurenna Alcaraz

Recurring cast
 Joanne Quintas as Sylvia Torres
 Kiel Rodriguez as Ruel Alcaraz

Guest cast
 Ricardo Cepeda as Vito Valdez
 Freddie Webb as Apollo Alcaraz
 Lorenz Tan as Achilles Valdez
 Ryan Eigenmann as Enrico dela Cruz
 Jace Flores as Anton Torres
 Glydel Mercado as Celina Valdez

Ratings
According to AGB Nielsen Philippines' Mega Manila household television ratings, the pilot episode of Ang Babaeng Hinugot sa Aking Tadyang earned a 30.1% rating. While the final episode scored a 32% rating.

References

External links
 

2009 Philippine television series debuts
2009 Philippine television series endings
Filipino-language television shows
GMA Network drama series
Philippine crime television series
Television shows based on comics
Television shows set in the Philippines